Adabaria is a village in Barguna District in the Barisal Division of southern-central Bangladesh.

See also
 List of villages in Bangladesh

References

External links
Satellite map at Maplandia.com

Villages in Barisal Division
Villages in Barguna District